Drew Emmitt is an American mandolinist, guitarist, fiddle player, occasional flutist, and singer, best known for being one of the founding members of Leftover Salmon, as well as being the frontman of the Left Hand String Band, Drew Emmitt Band, and the Emmitt-Nershi Band.

History

1989–present: Leftover Salmon

2005–present: Side projects
At the start of the band's deformation, Emmitt formed the Drew Emmitt Band.

In 2007, Emmitt and Bill Nershi of The String Cheese Incident and Honkytonk Homeslice started a project dubbed the Emmitt-Nershi Band. The band toured a small amount in the fall of 2007, and had a wide-scale tour planned for the duration of that year, including stops at festivals such as the High Sierra Music Festival.

Discography

Solo

Leftover Salmon

Left Hand String Band

References

External links
 Drew Emmitt Official Website

American bluegrass musicians
Musicians from Colorado
Year of birth missing (living people)
Living people
Place of birth missing (living people)
Leftover Salmon members